Ryan Nathan Sidebottom  (born 14 August 1989) is an Australian cricketer. He plays for Warwickshire as a pace bowler and has previously played for Victoria.

In August 2017, Sidebottom was signed for the remainder of the English season by Warwickshire, having had success with their second team and with Berkswell Cricket Club in the Birmingham and District Premier League. He made his Twenty20 debut on 9 July 2021, for Warwickshire in the 2021 T20 Blast. He made his List A debut on 22 July 2021, for Warwickshire in the 2021 Royal London One-Day Cup.

References

External links
 Ryan Sidebottom at Warwickshire County Cricket Club

1989 births
Living people
Australian cricketers
Victoria cricketers
People from Shepparton
Cricketers from Victoria (Australia)
Warwickshire cricketers
Derbyshire cricketers